Meshuggah, also known as Psykisk Testbild (Pronounced "see-kisk test-build") is the debut EP by Swedish extreme metal band Meshuggah. The three tracks on this EP were later reissued on the compilation Rare Trax. Although the EP is known as Psykisk Testbild ("mental test pattern"), this title is not to be found anywhere on the cover itself. It was released as a 12" vinyl record, limited to 1000 copies, by local record store Garageland in Umeå. This is the only Meshuggah record featuring drummer Niclas Lundgren. Tomas Haake later replaced Lundgren on drums.

Track listing

Personnel
 Jens Kidman – lead vocals, rhythm guitar
 Niclas Lundgren – drums
 Peter Nordin – bass
 Fredrik Thordendal – lead guitar, vocals

References

1989 debut EPs
Meshuggah albums